The Castle of Verrazzano is located about a mile from the center of Greve in Chianti in Italy, and sits on a mountain spur above the River Greve.

The castle dates back to an Etruscan, and then Roman, settlement. The Verrazzano family held the castle for centuries and the navigator Giovanni da Verrazzano is said to have been born there in 1485.

The last Verrazzano died in 1819, and the property passed through various wealthy Florentine families before coming to the Cappellinis.

A monument in New York City at the Verrazzano-Narrows Bridge, which was named after  Giovanni, includes three stones that were carved from the ancient wall of the castle.

References 

Castles in Tuscany